Bristol Bisons RFC is an inclusive English rugby union club based in Bristol. Founded in 2005 as the south west’s first inclusive rugby team, the Bisons have welcomed players (and supporters) of all abilities, backgrounds and sexualities from Bristol, Somerset, South Gloucestershire and the surrounding areas since that time.

Club history 
The Bristol Bisons RFC (Bisons) were established in 2005, following a visit to the Bingham Cup gay rugby tournament in the summer of 2004 in London. The founders felt that it would be good to spread the messages of an inclusive rugby team in the south west.

Training for the newly formed club started early in 2005 with its first match seeing the Bisons vs. a Barbarians side of players from Manchester and Bristol. By 2009, following a quiet spell, it was decided to relaunch the club with new kit and promotional material.

The club has had an active presence at Bristol Pride since 2010 and in July 2011, the team were chosen as hosts for the Union Cup 2013 European Gay rugby tournament, welcoming over 20 clubs to Bristol.

Since 2016, the Bisons have been hosted by and train every Monday and Thursday between 7-9pm at Clifton RFC.

As of 2023, the club now has over 70 active players and supporters, with current sponsorship and support from the likes of First Bus in the West of England, Event Exchange, Bristol Bear Bar and the Queenshilling nightclub.

Tournaments 
The following is a list of tournaments held by or attended by the team.

Tournaments hosted 
 2006 – Spring – Rugby Tournament, Bristol
 2006 – Rugby 7's tournament at Bristol Gay Mardi Gras
 2007 – Spring – Rugby Tournament, Bristol
 2013 – Union Cup – Rugby Tournament, Bristol

Tournaments attended

Union Cup 
 2005 Montpellier, France, finished in seventh place
 2007 Copenhagen, Denmark, part of a joint team with the Newcastle Ravens and Cardiff Lions that reached the final and lost to the Dublin Emerald Warriors RFC
 2009 London, UK, first in the 7's after a closely fought final against the Paris team
 2011 Amsterdam, Netherlands, second in the 10s tournament behind Montpellier, France
 2013 Bristol, UK, hosted in Bristol, UK 
 2016 Madrid, Spain, narrowly lost out on winning the Silver Union Bowl, finishing third from bottom in the European rankings
 2019 Dublin, Ireland, lost in the final to Kings Cross Steelers 3rds, finishing 10th over all in European rankings

Bingham Cup 
 2008 Dublin, Ireland, some members of the team played with the Cardiff Lions at the Dublin Bingham Cup in 2008
 2012 Manchester, England
 2018 Amsterdam, Netherlands, lost in the final of the Hoagland Bowl to Caledonian Thebans RFC, coming in 10th overall in Tier 2

Memberships and affiliations 
 Full member of the International Gay Rugby Association and Board (IGRAB)
 Affiliated members of the Gloucestershire Rugby Football Union (GRFU)
 Affiliated members of the Rugby Football Union(RFU)

Awards 
 2019 - Attitude Pride Award for #KeepKenHome campaign, helping to support one of its players risking deportation to Kenya
 2023 - Best Sports Group at the ShoutOut Listeners Awards

References

External links 
 
 

English rugby union teams
International Gay Rugby member clubs
Rugby union in Bristol